Latastia taylori, also known commonly as Taylor's long-tailed lizard, is a species of lizard in the family Lacertidae. The species is endemic to  Somalia.

Etymology
The specific name, taylori, is in honor of British army officer, Captain R. H. R. Taylor.

Reproduction
L. taylori is oviparous.

References

Further reading
Arillo A, Balletto E, Spanò S (1967). "Il genere Latastia Bedriaga in Somalia". Bollettino dei Musei e degli Istituti Biologici dell'Università di Genova 35: 105–145. (in Italian).
Lanza B (1990). "Amphibians and reptiles of the Somali Democratic Republic: checklist and biogeography". Biogeographia 14: 407–465.
Parker HW (1942). "The Lizards of British Somaliland, With an appendix on Topography and Climate by Capt. R. H. R. Taylor, O. B. E.". Bulletin of the Museum of Comparative Zoölogy at Harvard College 91: 1–101. (Latastia taylori, new species, pp. 72–74 + Figure 4, map, on p. 19).

Reptiles described in 1942
Latastia
Endemic fauna of Somalia
Reptiles of Somalia
Taxa named by Hampton Wildman Parker